Victor Zelman (1877–1960) was an Australian painter and etcher. He was born in Melbourne and was the son of Alberto Zelman (senior) and the brother of Alberto Zelman, the founder of the Melbourne Symphony Orchestra.

Life and career
Zellman was born into a musical family, both his father and his elder brother were noted musicians. He grew up in Carlton and attended King's College in Fitzroy. Victor mastered the viola and violin and performed in chamber orchestras as a young man. He trained at the National Gallery of Victoria Art School in Melbourne. After finishing his training, Zelman exhibited with other groups of traditional artists in the general exhibitions organised by the various artists' societies in Melbourne including The Victorian Artists’ Society, The Melbourne Artists’ Society, The Fine Art Society, The Painters and Etchers’ Society, and The New Gallery and submitted work in various municipal art competitions and exhibitions.

In 1907 Zellman married Clara Borsa. He was 46 when he held his first solo exhibition of paintings in Melbourne. In August 1923 at a small gallery run by Margaret McLean in the Tunnocks building at 125 Collins Street. It was reviewed in both the Age and Argus newspapers. The unnamed Age reviewer described it as a "loveable little show amidst picturesque surroundings" and implied that Victor was known already and setting out in a new direction with his landscape paintings. Victor was firmly in the camp of the Traditionalists who dominated the Melbourne art scene until the end of the 1930s. This style continued to be taught at the National Gallery Art School in Melbourne firmly entrenched there by the views of the Gallery director James S. McDonald.

Plein aire and impressionist landscapes were the popular choice of the Melbourne art public at this time. It was at the very end of the era started by the Melbourne Heidleberg School in the 1880s and soon to be riven by huge challenges to its dominance by young artists such as George Bell in Melbourne and the founding of the Melbourne Contemporary Group in 1932. European Modernism was almost unknown in Melbourne at this time and throughout his career, Victor showed little interest in its many iterations.

The Age review encouraged him and the public by adding "Mr Zelman has paid us a charming complement -he exhibits only his best work … all carefully studied and entirely satisfactory panels." His reviewer hoped that "If promises are fulfilled he will carve himself a niche among Australian landscape painters." The review concluded, "We will watch with deep interest Mr. Zelman’s future work."

Zelman continued to get encouraging reviews from the Argus and Age newspapers throughout the 1920s. The society gossip magazine Tabletop also reviewed his work favorably. His natural clientele was the comfortable middle class of Melbourne including so-called titled individuals who sometimes opened his exhibitions with condescending approval, but provided that cache of exclusiveness that was important in attracting sales. At one such opening, Lady Creswell claimed his name was "a household word in Victoria" and had painted in the hills on their property where she sent out a "jug of tea and cakes" to him to refresh him in his labors.

Throughout the 1920s and 1930s, Zelman travelled extensively throughout Victoria painting small plein aire scenes approximately 30 x 20 cm and studies for larger works up to 70 x 90 cm. He would stay for some time in an area working at a number of canvasses before returning to his studio. Amongst the places named in his paintings are Romsey, Carlsruhe, Croydon, Castlemaine, Glen Waverley, Dromana, Rosebud, Shoreham, Mooroolbark, Diamond Creek, Ashburton, Lilydale, Port of Melbourne and the Goulburn and Murray rivers. When at home he painted and etched many scenes from his local area, Hepburn Springs and Daylesford.

Gallery holdings
 National Gallery of Australia
Hepburn Springs (etching) 
The Artists Home (etching).
 National Gallery of Victoria
Promise of Spring (oil on canvas)
Reflections, Thornton (aquatint and etching)
Sailor's Mission Church (aquatint)
 Art Gallery of New South Wales
Hepburn Bridge (etching)
 Castlemaine Art Museum
Donovan’s Bridge (oil on board) 
Croydon Gum (oil on canvas)
Old Farm near Castlemaine (etching)
 Untitled gum tree (etching)
 National Library of Australia
Murray River Steamer (engraving)
 Benalla Art Gallery
 Gums at Shepherds Flat (oil on board)

Exhibitions 
August 1923, Tunnock Buildings, 125 Collins St, Melbourne (solo show, landscape paintings)
Tranquil Pastures
The Last Load 
Rising Mists 
Gums at Silvan 
The Bush Road 
Willows 
Breakneck Hepburn

April, 1925, Fine Art Society, 100 Exhibition St, Melbourne (solo show, oil paintings)

Glen Waverley
Turning the Plough
Fleeting Sunshine 
An Old Gum Dromana 
Gums Croydon  
The Old Road  
The Drinking Pool  
Doctor's Gully Hepburn
Jim Crow Creek
Wattle Hepburn 
Green Pastures
Mooroolbark 
Near Croydon
Early Morning
Jubilee Lake Daylesford
Sunset Glow
Haystooks
A Little Grey Hut in the Bush 
Diamond Creek 
Ashburton 
Haycarting
Stewart's Farm
The Woodmen 
Ballharrie's Corner 
The Bush Path 
Leggo's Farm
Rowe's Harvest 
The Old Homestead 
The Piggery Tunstall
 Mountain View Croydon 
The Silo Croydon 
Lilydale
Rosebud
Cutting the Crop 
Reaping and Binding 
The Edge of the Lake 
Evening
The Pink Tree Croydon

November 1928, The New Gallery, Melbourne (solo show, landscape paintings)
 
Plums 
Trawool 
Sun Wind and Rain 
Garden Hill 
Sand Carters 
Carrum
Whittlesea
Reflections of the Goulburn 
Wintry Day 
Monegatta 
Shoreham 
Mt William Romsey 
Lobb's Farm Romsey 
Jim Crow Creek 
Shoreham 
Deep Creek Romsey
Between the Showers Carlsruhe

December 1931, 7th Annual Christmas Exhibition of Etchings and Woodcuts by leading English and Australian Artists, Sedon Galleries, Melbourne
Reflections, Thornton
Shepherds Flat
The Wood Carter
The Burnley Ferry
Pastoral
Sailors Mission Church

December 1932, 8th Christmas Exhibition of Etchings and Woodcuts by Master Etchers, Sedon Galleries, Melbourne

(Same works as in the 7th Annual Christmas Exhibition)

Works sold since 1970 
According to the Australian Art Sales Digest, 134 of Zelman's works have been sold between 1969 and 2016. As of 2016 the highest recorded price for a painting was A$14,500, while works on paper including prints and graphics have fetched up to $220. The following works have been sold at auction since 1970.

Oil on board 
Many of the paintings have similar names. Different sizes of the boards indicated that all listed here are separate paintings.

The Last Load 
Hepburn Springs, Daylesford 
Country Valley 
The Team
Near Macedon 
Afternoon Pastoral
Summer Light 
Romsey Landscape 
Wattle and Gum
Bush Road 
The Lonely Bull 
Bush Road near Hepburn Springs 
Orchard Country 
Dawn Reflections 
Gum Trees at Hepburn Springs 
The Lagoon, Diamond Creek 
Sheep in paddock 
Poplars at Shepherd's Flat
 A Bush Track Romsey 
Gums at Daylesford 
The Haycart 
Morning Hepburn 
Spring Day, Burwood 
Spring Landscape 
Figures and Ox Cart in Coastal Landscape 
Cattle grazing in Treed Landscape 
Evening Light, Hepburn Springs 
Pavillion, Hepburn Springs
Mt Franklin Near Hepburn Springs 
Settler’s Cottage 
Haycarting 
Cottages Near Daylesford 
Port Scene 
Plums 
Cows Grazing 
Cattle in Landscape 
Pastoral Landscape 
Boating Near Hepburn Springs 
Bush Road, Hepburn Springs 
Gums at Croydon  
Reflections, Thornton 
A Summers Day 
The Jinker 
Horse and Cart 
Boating Near Hepburn Springs 
Spring is Whispering 
Harvest Hillsides 
Swans on the River 
Summer Landscape 
Lilydale 
Sailors Creek 
Grazing Cattle
Lorne, Mt. Pleasant (pair of paintings) 
Impressionist Victorian Landscape 
Tranquil Morning 
Panoramic Landscape 
Nocturne
Riverside Pastoral 
Pastoral Landscape 
Australian Landscape 
Twilight 
In the Dandenongs 
Dandenong Vista 
Harvest Time 
The Prospector's Tent 
Evening Hillside
Lithgow Near Katoomba 
Sheep on Hillside, Leggott's Farm
Australian Pastorale 
Bush 
The Haymakers 
Old Mill, Hepburn Springs 
Early Evening 
The Fruit Pickers 
Sheep Amongst the Gums 
Near Daylesford 
Derriben Creek [sic]
The Old Ballan Road at Daylesford
The Little River 
The Old Waterwheel 
View of Canterbury 
Shepherds Flat 
Summer Pastures 
Forest Pool 
Lorne 
Morning, Hepburn 
Thunder Sky Near Hepburn Springs 
River trees 
Pastoral 
Gums and Sheep 
Bush Country 
Pastoral 
Misty Morning, Silvan 
Camouflaged Ships 
The Quiet Pool

Watercolors 
Landscape
Homestead
Thornton

Prints or etchings 
Gums
Trees
Farm Near Castlemaine

References

1877 births
1960 deaths
Artists from Melbourne